Cyttopsis rosea, the rosy dory, is a zeiform fish which is found on the continental slopes in most parts of the Atlantic and Pacific Oceans. It growth up to 22 cm and feeds on other fishes and on swimming crustaceans. It is often caught as bycatch in deep trawl fisheries, but is not utilized.

References

Zeiformes
Fish described in 1843